Jordan Leborgne (born 29 September 1995) is a Guadeloupean professional footballer who plays as a midfielder for French  club Versailles and the Guadeloupe national team.

Club career
Leborgne is a youth exponent from Caen. He made his Ligue 1 debut on 12 September 2015 against Troyes.

On 5 July 2022, Leborgne signed with Versailles.

International career
Leborgne debuted for the Guadeloupe national team in a friendly 2–0 loss to Cape Verde on 23 March 2022.

References

External links
Jordan Leborgne at La Preferente

1995 births
Living people
People from Pointe-à-Pitre
Association football midfielders
Guadeloupean footballers
Guadeloupe international footballers
French footballers
French expatriate footballers
French expatriate sportspeople in Spain
Expatriate footballers in Spain
French people of Guadeloupean descent
Stade Malherbe Caen players
Rodez AF players
FC Versailles 78 players
Ligue 1 players
Championnat National 2 players
Championnat National 3 players